A list of films produced by the Bollywood film industry based in Mumbai in 1930:

A-B

C-D

E-H

I-O

P-R

S

T-Z

References

External links
Bollywood films of 1930 at IMDb

1930
Bollywood
Films, Bollywood